The Statue of Alexander VII is a large sculpture of Fabio Chigi (Pope Alexander VII), designed by the Italian artist Gian Lorenzo Bernini and executed by a member of his studio, probably Antonio Raggi. It sits in its original location of the Cathedral of Siena. It was begun in 1661 and completed in 1663.

See also
List of works by Gian Lorenzo Bernini

Links
Image of statue from Courtauld Institute of Art

References

External links

Sculptures by Gian Lorenzo Bernini
Sculptures of popes
Pope Alexander VII